Richard Grenier (born September 18, 1952) is a Canadian-born Austrian former professional ice hockey centre who played 10 games in the National Hockey League.

Early life 
Grenier was born in Montreal. As a youth, he played in the 1965 Quebec International Pee-Wee Hockey Tournament with a minor ice hockey team from Saint-Eusèbe, Quebec.

Career 
Grenier played 10 games with the New York Islanders,and 34 games in the World Hockey Association with the Quebec Nordiques. The rest of his career, which lasted from 1972 to 1990, was spent in the minor leagues and then in the Austrian Hockey League. A naturalized Austrian, he played for the Austrian national team at the 1987 World Championship B Pool.

Career statistics

Regular season and playoffs

International

References

External links
 

1952 births
Living people
Beauce Jaros players
Binghamton Dusters players
Canadian ice hockey centres
EC VSV players
EHC Arosa players
Fort Worth Texans players
Fort Worth Wings players
Lahti Pelicans players
Maine Nordiques players
New Haven Nighthawks players
New York Islanders draft picks
New York Islanders players
Nova Scotia Voyageurs players
Quebec Nordiques (WHA) players
Quebec Remparts players
Rosemont National players
Ice hockey people from Montreal
Verdun Maple Leafs (ice hockey) players
VEU Feldkirch players
Wiener EV players